The eleventh edition of Dancing Stars was broadcast from March 31, 2017 on ORF1 and presented by Mirjam Weichselbraun and Klaus Eberhartinger.

Couples

Scoreboard

Average Chart

Dances

Weekly Dances and Scores

Week 1

Week 2

Week 3

Week 4

Week 5

Week 6

Week 7: Eurovision Night

 Due to a fatigue fracture, Monica Weinzettl can no longer participate on Dancing Stars. Therefore, no elimination will take place on week 7 and the Judge's scores and Viewer votes will be combined with the scores and votes from week 8 when the next couple will be eliminated.

Week 8

Week 9

Week 10

Dance Chart

 Highest scoring dance
 Lowest scoring dance
 Not scored or danced by the celebrity
 Danced, but not scored

Notes

References
Official website of Dancing Stars

Season 11
2017 Austrian television seasons